The National Track and Field Hall of Fame is a museum operated by The Armory Foundation in conjunction with USA Track & Field. It is located within the Armory Foundation (the former Fort Washington Avenue Armory) at 216 Fort Washington Avenue, between 168th and 169th Streets, in Washington Heights, in the New York City borough of Manhattan. The stated goal of the Hall is to reflect upon, appreciate, and honor the past by saluting Americans who have made important contributions to the history of Track and Field. Inductees to the Hall of Fame include athletes, coaches, contributors, officials, event directors, journalists and administrators. USA Track & Field has been inducting members into the Hall since 1974.  Currently there are 254 people enshrined.

History
The National Track and Field Hall of Fame was founded in Charleston, West Virginia in 1974.  The museum moved to Indianapolis, Indiana in 1985 when it came under the auspices of USA Track & Field, the national governing body for the sport of track and field in the United States.  The Indianapolis museum closed in 1996 when the exhibits were moved for the 1996 Centennial Olympics in Atlanta, Georgia.  The exhibits were then displayed in Los Angeles, California before touring across the nation as a traveling museum until 2002 when The Armory building was chosen as its permanent location.

Exhibits include the original 1976 Nike Waffle Trainers and a singlet and shorts worn by Hall of Famer Steve Prefontaine.

Nomination criteria
The nomination criteria differs for the type of inductee as follows:

Athlete
Only open class accomplishments are considered.  In order to be considered, an athlete must have participated in an open competition at least three years prior to consideration, except when an athlete has reached forty years of age, and must fall into one or more of the following criteria:

 World record holder
 American record holder
 World champion
 Olympic champion;
 World or American leader in event(s) for three or more years;
 Winner of four or more USA national open championships; and/or
 Other outstanding accomplishments at a national open or international open level.

Coach
To be nominated, a coach must have been retired for at least one year from active full-time coaching, except where the nominated person has coached for thirty-five (35) years or more, and must fall into the following criteria:

 Having compiled an outstanding record of coaching champions at the level coached (e.g. national open, national collegiate, state high school, etc.); and
 Having compiled an extraordinary winning record or have achieved other outstanding accomplishments; and
 Having coached for at least twenty (20) years.

Contributor
In order to be nominated as a Contributor, the nominee must have served the Athletics community with special distinction and worked within the athletics community in its best interests in an outstanding manner for at least twenty (20) years.  Contributors may also be nominated for having achieved other outstanding accomplishments.

Additional categories
Also under USATF is the Masters Hall of Fame, created in 1996 and the Officials Hall of Fame created in 2007.  The membership of those two halls are selected by separate committees of those divisions of USATF for separate achievements in those divisions.  As such, there is some duplication of names.  Those members currently exist as a list of honored names, but have no physical representation at the hall in New York City.

Selection process
Each February, the National Track & Field Board and Screening Committee begins to actively seek nominations which are due by May 1 each year.  On May 15, all nominations (including those carry-over nominations from previous years which have not been under consideration for the maximum five (5) years) are compiled by the national staff of USA Track & Field.  All nominations are then reviewed by the Hall of Fame Screening Committee which is charged with forwarding the best candidates eligible to the voters.  The membership of the Committee is confidential.  The Committee has full authority to make nominations to create the best ballot possible.  The Staff Coordinator for the Hall of Fame creates the ballot of ten (10) nominees (the number of nominees may be increased for equity in gender, discipline, and era of competition or service, but will never number more than twelve (12) nominees) and accompanying documentation (biographies, etc.) by June 30.  The ballot is then reviewed by the President of the Hall of Fame and chair of the Screening Committee before being forwarded to the voters near the end of July.  The voters include inducted Hall of Famers, the Hall of Fame committee members and selected members of the Track and Field Writers of America.  Each voter has one vote and any voter who fails to cast a ballot for two (2) consecutive years may be removed from the list of eligible voters until they request and cast a ballot in a subsequent year.  All ballots must be returned to the accounting firm responsible for tabulation of votes by August 29.  In the beginning of September, Accounting firm, chair of the Screening Committee, and President of the Board review the ballots and declare the inductees who are announced later in the month.

Museum

Located at The Armory Foundation, at 216 Fort Washington Avenue in Washington Heights, New York the museum is split into three levels.  The first level contains main lobby, the Hall of Fame Theater (featuring a film simply called "Welcome to The Hall of Fame", produced by Peter Frankfurt) and the Hall of Fame History Gallery, where the Olympic Moment film produced by Bud Greenspan can be viewed.  The second level holds the Hall of Fame Atrium, the Hall of Fame Champion Gallery and the Fred Lebow Marathon Hall .  The third level holds the Hall of Fame Gallery featuring a -long etched glass wall with the names of all the inductees engraved upon it.  Through the glass wall visitors can see the  arena that is home to the largest indoor collegiate and high school invitational events in the world.

Inductees
The following table lists all persons who have been inducted into the National Track and Field Hall of Fame.

Notes

References

External links
 National Track and Field Hall of Fame
 Armory Foundation

Sport of athletics awards
Track and field in New York City
Track
Sports halls of fame
Sports museums in New York City
Museums in Manhattan
Washington Heights, Manhattan
Awards established in 1974
Sports organizations established in 1974
Track and field organizations